Dejan Školnik (born 1 January 1989) is a Croatian footballer who plays as a midfielder for Pohorje.

Club career
Školnik started his career with hometown NK Maribor at the age of 7, and then transferred to Železničar Maribor at the age of 14. He played there for three years before returning to Maribor, where he signed his first professional contract.

Školnik then played for Maribor in the Slovenian PrvaLiga for three seasons, earning 72 appearances and scoring 6 goals in the process. After the 2009–10 season, he moved to Portuguese first division team Nacional, where he joined his former Maribor teammate Rene Mihelič, signing a five-year contract.

Školnik later played in the Austrian lower divisions.

International career
Školnik was a member of the Croatian under-21 team. Before his international debut for Croatia, he was offered a place in the Slovenian under-21, but Školnik turned down the offer and decided in favour of his parents' homeland.

References

External links
 

1989 births
Living people
Sportspeople from Maribor
Association football midfielders
Slovenian footballers
Croatian footballers
Croatia youth international footballers
Croatia under-21 international footballers
NK Maribor players
C.D. Nacional players
NK Aluminij players
FC ViOn Zlaté Moravce players
Mantova 1911 players
NK Drava Ptuj (2004) players
Slovenian PrvaLiga players
Primeira Liga players
Slovenian Second League players
Slovak Super Liga players
Serie C players
Austrian Landesliga players
Croatian expatriate footballers
Croatian expatriate sportspeople in Portugal
Expatriate footballers in Portugal
Croatian expatriate sportspeople in Slovakia
Expatriate footballers in Slovakia
Croatian expatriate sportspeople in Italy
Expatriate footballers in Italy
Croatian expatriate sportspeople in Austria
Expatriate footballers in Austria